The 12023 / 12024 Patna Junction–Howrah Jan Shatabdi Express is a Superfast Express train of the Jan Shatabdi Express series belonging to Indian Railways – East Central Railway zone that runs between  and  in India.

It operates as train number 12024 from Patna Junction to Howrah Junction and as train number 12023 in the reverse direction, serving the states of Bihar, Jharkhand and West Bengal.

It is one of the most important and high priority train in its entire route and is given highest preference over all other trains.

It used to run as a Shatabdi Express from Patna to Howrah (introduced on Nov 2001) but due to low patronage this train was converted to Jan Shatabdi Express launched by the former railway minister of India, Mr. Nitish Kumar in the 2002 / 03 Railway Budget  .

Coaches

The 12024 / 23 Patna Junction-Howrah Jan Shatabdi Express has 3 AC Chair Car, 16 Second Class seating & 2 Power cars. It does not carry a pantry car .
The LHB coach of the train can run with a maximum speed of 130 km/hr.

As is customary with most train services in India, coach composition may be amended at the discretion of Indian Railways depending on demand.

Service

As the average speed of the train is above , as per Indian Railways rules, its fare includes a Superfast surcharge.

12024 is 2nd fastest in terms of time(1st being 12306 Howrah Rajdhani Express which takes 7hrs 20 mins from Patna Junction to Howrah Junction) and it takes around 7hrs 40 mins to cover entire journey from Patna to Howrah.

It is also the second fastest of all Jan Shatabdi Express in terms of speeds.

Major stops of 12024/23 Patna Jan Shatabdi Express:

Lucckesarai Junction

Howrah Junction

Routeing

Traction

As the entire route is fully electrified, a Howrah-based WAP-7 locomotive powers the train for its entire journey.

Operation

12023 Howrah–Patna Junction Jan Shatabdi Express runs from Howrah Junction on all days except Sunday arriving Patna Junction the same day .
12024 Patna Junction–Howrah Jan Shatabdi Express runs from Patna Junction on all days except Sunday arriving Howrah Junction the same day .

Rake sharing

The 12024 / 23 Patna Junction–Howrah Jan Shatabdi Express shares its rake with 12365 / 66 Patna–Ranchi Jan Shatabdi Express.

References 

 http://pib.nic.in/archive/railbudget/railbgt2002-03/railbgtsp1.html
 https://web.archive.org/web/20160126012037/http://www.indianrail.gov.in/jan_shatabdi.html

External links

Rail transport in West Bengal
Rail transport in Jharkhand
Rail transport in Bihar
Jan Shatabdi Express trains
Trains from Howrah Junction railway station
Rail transport in Howrah
Transport in Patna